Clarence A. Bain Airport  is an airport serving Mangrove Cay, part of Andros Island in The Bahamas.

Facilities

Airlines and destinations

References

External links
 
 

Airports in the Bahamas
Andros, Bahamas